GUE may refer to:

 Gue, a musical instrument
 Belle Willey Gue (1860–1944), American writer
 Benjamin F. Gue (1828–1904), American newspaper editor and politician
 European United Left (1994–95)
European United Left–Nordic Green Left (GUE/NGL), a democratic-socialist political group in the European Parliament
 Gaussian unitary ensemble
 Geneon Universal Entertainment, a Japanese entertainment company
 Global Underwater Explorers, an American diving organization
 Great Underground Empire, a fictional kingdom in the Zorkuniverse
 Guernsey
 Gue (Lahul and Spiti), a village in Lahaul and Spiti district in India